Andrew Jacobs is an American correspondent for The New York Times.

Jacobs has been based in Beijing, China, since April 2008, covering the country for The New York Times. He is also the director and producer of a 2008 documentary, Four Seasons Lodge.

Early life
Jacobs, who is Jewish and one of three children, was born in Newark, New Jersey, to Martin G. Jacobs, a nephrologist, and Barbara Jacobs. His sisters are Wendy, a county commissioner in Durham, North Carolina, and Ellen, a psychotherapist in Manhattan, New York City. He grew up in South Orange, New Jersey. He graduated from Columbia High School, and from New York University, where he studied architecture and urban design.

In 1989, Jacobs was an English teacher at Hubei University in Wuhan, China. He served as press secretary for Tom Duane during his successful run for the New York City Council in 1991.

Journalism career
Jacobs contributed to the Associated Press, Village Voice, and New York Newsday during the Tiananmen Square protests of 1989. Later, he served as editor of Manhattan Spirit and Our Town, founded and was news editor of QW magazine, and edited a number of New York City newsweeklies, including The Brooklyn Phoenix and The Villager.

He began writing for The New York Times in 1995. He has reported for various New York Times desks, including National, Business, Culture, and Styles. Since April 2008, he is a New York Times  correspondent in Beijing, China. His writing focuses on Chinese politics, including Uighur-Han Chinese relations, Chen Guangcheng's escape, and the loss of power of Bo Xilai.

Awards
In 2002, he was part of a team of reporters who won a Pulitzer Prize for Public Service for coverage of the September 11 attacks in Manhattan.  In 2009, Jacobs was part of a team of reporters that won the Pulitzer Prize for Breaking News Reporting related to the Eliot Spitzer prostitution scandal.

In 2009, the Society of Publishers in Asia (SOPA) acknowledged his coverage of the government's crackdown on dissent during the Beijing Olympics entitled "In the Shadow of the Olympics" with an honorable mention in the category Excellence in Human Rights Reporting. In 2010, SOPA acknowledged him and several other New York Times writers with the Award for Excellence in the category Excellence in Feature Writing for Uneasy Engagement, a 10-part series that explored China's growing influence in the world. In 2011, he and a group of New York Times reporters were finalists for a Gerald Loeb Award, for their reporting on Google's clash with the Chinese government over censorship issues.

Film career
Jacobs directed and produced Four Seasons Lodge, a feature-length 2008 documentary shot two years prior. It is about a group of elderly Jewish Holocaust survivors spending the summer at a  vacation bungalow colony in Ellenville in the Catskills in upstate New York prior to the property being sold.  The documentary is based on material he wrote for a series in the New York Times "Metro" section.

Rather than interviewing the participants, Jacobs filmed them interacting with one another. Academy Award-nominated Albert Maysles was one of four cinematographers who worked on the film. They shot 250 hours of film to create the 97-minute documentary.

The film opened at the Hamptons International Film Festival in October 2008. It won the Audience Award for Best Documentary at the Miami Jewish Film Festival.

References

External links
 
 "Recent and archived news articles by Andrew Jacobs", The New York Times
"The Hard Part: A Series; Articles in this series chronicle; Mayor Cory A. Booker's tenure in Newark's City Hall", The New York Times
"Articles in the Uneasy Engagement series from The New York Times examined the stresses and strains of China's emergence as a global power", The New York Times
Four Seasons Lodge documentary web site

Living people
Journalists from New Jersey
The New York Times writers
Jewish American writers
Writers from Newark, New Jersey
People from South Orange, New Jersey
Columbia High School (New Jersey) alumni
Year of birth missing (living people)
New York University alumni
American documentary film directors
American documentary film producers
Film directors from New Jersey
Film producers from New Jersey
21st-century American Jews